Nrupatunga Nagara Sarige is a city public transport bus service in Kalaburagi, in Karnataka, India.

It is operated by the Kalyana Karnataka Road Transport Corporation.

History
The service was introduced by the KKRTC on 18 October 2012 with 17 buses and 290 schedules, and covering a distance of 53.4 km.

Rashtrakuta Sarige
KKRTC started the service between Sedam and Kalaburagi, under the name Rashtrakuta service, as Malkhed in Sedam Taluk was the capital of the Rashtrakuta Kingdom.

See also
List of bus depots in Karnataka

List of bus stations in Karnataka

Gallery

References

Metropolitan transport agencies of India
Bus transport in Karnataka